Jason David BeDuhn (born 1963) is a historian of religion and culture, currently Professor of Religious Studies at Northern Arizona University.

Education
BeDuhn holds a B.A. in Religious studies from the University of Illinois at Urbana–Champaign, an M.T.S. in New Testament and Christian Origins from Harvard Divinity School, and a Ph.D. in the Comparative Study of Religions from Indiana University Bloomington.

Research

Manichaeism and Augustine
Much of BeDuhn's published research relates to Manichaeism, particularly its disciplinary and ritual systems, but also its role as a catalyst in religious history, as well as its distinctive interpretation of Christian traditions related to the teachings of Jesus and Paul. BeDuhn considers that the conversion of Augustine from Manichaeism to Nicene Christianity was not a sudden act but a life-long transformation, with the narrative we now have being the product of Augustine's own idealized retrospect. BeDuhn roots Augustine's dissatisfaction with the Manichaean faith in its practice-focused way of life and external social pressures leading him towards apostasy. The 383 AD law ordered by Flavius Hypatius that condemned anyone who converted from Christianity to Paganism, Judaism, or Manichaeism is cited as one of these strong social pressures.

Marcionite priority

Beginning with his book The First New Testament: Marcion's Scriptural Canon, BeDuhn has stated that the Gospel of Marcion (called simply 'The Gospel' by adherents of Marcionism) was not produced nor adapted by Marcion of Sinope, but instead adopted by him from a pre-existing gospel text from which he says the Gospel of Luke is also derived.

BeDuhn suggests that Luke may be a post-Marcion redaction, but maintains a form of the two-source hypothesis, with Marcion's Gospel interchanged with Luke as the product of a combination of Mark and Q. This differs slightly from Matthias Klinghardt's view that Marcion's gospel was based on the Gospel of Mark, with the Gospel of Matthew based on Mark and Marcion, and the Gospel of Luke expanding on Marcion with reference to Matthew and Mark.

These views contrast with the belief of the Church Fathers and biblical scholars such as Bruce Metzger and Bart Ehrman that Marcion redacted the Gospel of Luke in accordance with his personal theology. Theologian Adolf von Harnack also accepted the view of the Church Fathers that Marcion wished to "purify" the Evangelion to an original state given by Christ and defy the fabricated Gospel of Luke, all without appealing to revelation.

Projects 
BeDuhn has been involved in a collaborative project to edit and translate an ancient Coptic Manichaean manuscript with funding from the National Endowment for the Humanities and the Australian Research Council.

Awards 
 BeDuhn won the Best First Book Award from the American Academy of Religion in 2001 for his book The Manichaean Body in Discipline and Ritual, notable for its analysis of religions as goal-oriented systems of practice rationalized within particular models of reality.
 He was named a Guggenheim Fellow in 2004.

Bibliography

Thesis

Books authored 
In 2010 and 2013, BeDuhn published a two-part work entitled Augustine's Manichaean Dilemma in which he considers "the deep imprint of Manicheanism on Augustine".

Books edited 
 1997 with Paul Mirecki: Emerging from Darkness: Studies in the Recovery of Manichaean Sources. Leiden: E. J. Brill.
 2001 with Paul Mirecki: The Light and the Darkness: Studies in Manichaeism and its World. Leiden: E. J. Brill.
 2007 with Paul Mirecki: Frontiers of Faith: The Christian-Manichaean Encounter in the Acts of Archelaus. Leiden: E. J. Brill.
 2009 New Light on Manichaeism: Papers from the 6th International Meeting of the IAMS. Leiden: E. J. Brill.

References

Sources
 "About the Author," Truth in Translation, p. 200.

Living people
American theologians
University of Illinois Urbana-Champaign alumni
Harvard Divinity School alumni
Indiana University Bloomington alumni
Northern Arizona University faculty
1963 births
Place of birth missing (living people)
Marcionism
Members of the Jesus Seminar